Jabal Zayn al-Abidin is a mountain east of the town of Qamhana and north of Hama in Syria. It has an elevation of 620 meters and is located near Jabal Kafraa. It is the 31st highest mountain in the Hama Governorate and the 544th highest in Syria.

The mountain is named after the shrine of Ali Zayn al-Abidin, the son of Husayn ibn Ali. The shrine was built to commemorate the death of Zayn al-Abidin. It is a relatively minor site of visitation my Shia Muslims, including visiting Iranian pilgrims. It is also venerated by some members of Syria's Ismaili community, being one of the few shrines Ismailis venerate after the ban on shrine visitation in the 20th century by Ismaili religious authorities.

References

Bibliography

Mountains of Hama Governorate